The grey whipsnake (Demansia simplex) is a species of venomous snake in the family Elapidae.

References

Snakes of Australia
Demansia
Reptiles described in 1978
Reptiles of the Northern Territory
Reptiles of Western Australia